The celestial police, officially the United Astronomical Society (VAG), were an informal group of astronomers working in the early 19th century with the express purpose of finding additional planets in the solar system.  Inspired by the work of William Herschel and the discovery of Uranus, the first planet not known to the ancients, the celestial police made discoveries of numerous objects in orbit around the sun, notably several of those in orbit between Mars and Jupiter, which would lead to the identification of the asteroid belt.

History 

The group was founded in 1800 by Franz Xaver von Zach, a German astronomer and editor of the journal Monatliche Correspondenz zur Beförderung der Erd- und Himmels-Kunde, when he sent letters out to a select group of astronomers, asking them to dedicate themselves to a search for a "missing planet".  The leadership of the group was undertaken by Wilhelm Olbers, who himself would discover numerous objects and formulate what is called Olbers' Paradox.  The Titius–Bode law had predicted a planet to be found in orbit between Mars and Jupiter, where none was then found.  This gave the group a location to concentrate their search.  Just as the group was forming, Italian Giuseppe Piazzi discovered Ceres, the largest object in the region that would later be named the asteroid belt.  Over the next several years, the group found and identified three more objects in similar orbits, which were named Pallas, Juno, and Vesta.  After discovering such a large number of relatively small objects in a similar orbit, it became clear that no planet-sized object likely existed in that region. The group members' interest waned in the search.  Additionally, the Napoleonic Wars had disrupted the work of several group members, especially when the war came to Lilienthal, Lower Saxony, whose observatory served as the home for many of the scientists working with the celestial police. It would be another generation before any further major discoveries of planets (or even large asteroids) occurred.

Members 

The name "celestial police" is generally assigned to the group of 24 men invited by von Zach (and including himself) to participate in the search for additional planets in the region that would later be named the asteroid belt.  Not every one of these invitees actively participated in the search, and others who worked on the problem, often alongside members of the celestial police, such as Friedrich Bessel, are not included in the group.  The canonical list of 24 members of the celestial police are (as organized by primary residence):

Germany
Johann Elert Bode
Johann Sigismund Gottfried Huth
Georg Simon Klügel
Julius August Koch
Johann Friedrich Wurm
Ferdinand Adolf Freiherr von Ende
Johann Gildemeister
Karl Ludwig Harding
Heinrich Wilhelm Matthias Olbers
Johann Hieronymus Schröter
Franz Xaver von Zach
Austria
Johann Tobias Bürg
Denmark
Thomas Bugge
Sweden
Daniel Melanderhjelm
Jöns Svanberg
Russia
Theodor von Schubert
France
Johann Karl Burckhardt
Pierre Méchain
Charles Messier
Joseph Thulis
England
Nevil Maskelyne
William Herschel
Italy
Barnaba Oriani
Giuseppe Piazzi

References

Astronomers
Astronomy organizations
Organizations established in 1800
Planetary science